Oxysternon festivum  is a species of dung-beetle of the scarab beetle family.

Description

Oxysternon festivum has a colored dorsum and black head and underside, the pronotum is smooth. As most Oxysternon species, it has considerable variation in color, ranging from the typical coppery-red to entirely black, and including yellow-red and green forms. The black form is apparently restricted to the Island of Trinidad and thus considered as a separate subspecies (O. festivum nigerrimum Arnaud, 2002).

Major males are horned and substantially bigger than the hornless female, while minor males are hornless and often smaller than females. Females and small males differ in the form of the transverse carina.

Taxonomy and nomenclature
Oxysternon festivum was among the first dung beetle species studied by zoologist in the early 18th century. The first illustration of an "exceedingly beautiful shining gold and red, three horned beetle" was published in 1747 by August Johann Rösel von Rosenhof, and a first description was done by Laurens Theodorus Gronovius in 1764, but the names applied were non-binomial and therefore invalid for nomenclatural purposes. It was later re-described by Carl Linnaeus under the name of Scarabaeus festivus, and was subsequently included in most publications regarding exotic insects in the late 18th and early 19th centuries.

O. festivum was once assigned to the genus Sternaspis, but the name was preoccupied and thus invalid. Laporte, writing under the pen name of Le Compte de Castelnau, proposed the genus Oxysternon to include several species of Phaneus-like species with a long, spiniform extension of the anterior angle of the metasternum. O. festivum was later designated as the type species of this genus.

Two color forms were described as aberrations by Olsoufieff, and later formalised as subspecies by Arnaud, using the names O. festivum viridanum for the green form and O. festivum nigerrimum for the black form. However the green coloration is apparently part of the phenotypical variation of the species and thus is not recognized as a separate subspecies.

Behaviour

The distinct male morphotypes are associated to different reproductive tactics: major males fight for females and guard and defend burrows actively, while minor males evade fights and try to sneak to the burrows to mate with females.

This species is attracted to dung, carrion and fruits as food resources, but are only known to breed on dung and carrion.

Distribution
This species is mostly restricted to the Guiana Shield and can be found in French Guiana, Guyana, Suriname, Venezuela, Brazil, Colombia, and Trinidad.

Habitat
Oxysternon festivum lives in forest but can tolerate certain degree of habitat perturbation.

References

Scarabaeidae
Beetles of South America
Arthropods of Brazil
Arthropods of Colombia
Arthropods of South America
Fauna of French Guiana
Invertebrates of Guyana
Fauna of Suriname
Arthropods of Trinidad and Tobago
Invertebrates of Venezuela
Beetles described in 1767
Taxa named by Carl Linnaeus